Tennikoit, also called Ringtennis or tenniquoits, is a sport played on a tennis-style court, with a circular rubber ring ("tennikoit", c.f. the game quoits) hurled over a net separating the two players, with each endeavoring to catch and return the hurled ring into the opponent's court. The sport is played on indoor and outdoor courts.

A number of disciplines exist. "Singles" is a two-player game requiring two opposing players. "Doubles" is a four-player game requiring two teams opposing each other where each team consists of two players each. In "Mixed Doubles", one male player and one female form a team.

The sport is played in 14 countries. It is particularly popular in Germany, South Africa, Brazil, and the Subcontinent nations of India, Pakistan, and Bangladesh. 

Ringtennis/Tennikoits South Africa

Ringtennis/Tennikoits has been played in South Africa as far back as 1947 and is managed by the SA Ringtennis Union, and proud to be affiliated to the World Tenniquoits Federation.

In South Africa there are currently 4 affiliated provincial Unions with affiliated clubs, namely Gauteng Central (Alberton Ringtennis Club, Kempton Ringtennis Club) Gauteng North, Sedibeng (Vanderbijlpark, Parys) and Limpopo.

The game is played in 14 countries worldwide and is particularly popular in Germany, South Africa, and India.

The basic goal of Ringtennis/Tenniquoits is to throw a ring (made of solid rubber) with one hand and a variety of different techniques over a net into the opposing half of the court in such a way, that the ring hits the ground, or the opponent is unable to catch, control or return the ring.

Each game is 20 minutes long (10 minutes per side) and managed by a referee. Games are played as singles, doubles, or mixed doubles. The player/players with the highest score at the end of the 20 minutes wins the game!

History
The origins of tennikoit are unclear, with some sources claiming a German origin, but a more immediate ancestor of the game is likely the game of deck tennis, a physical recreation activity commonly played on cruise ships at the start of the 20th century on smaller versions of tennis courts using rings made of rubber or another soft material.

Rules

The game begins as one player serves the ring upwards over the net, diagonally into the opponents court, and the opponent tries to catch the ring before it can land in their court, and if so throw it back. Each player takes five services in a row, regardless of whether they have scored points for a serve, and then the opponent serves for the following five turns. 

Each individual (or double) tries to score 21 points in order to be declared a winner, but the winner must maintain a lead of two points over the opponent to win. A game consists of 3 sets of 21 points; the winner of 2 sets wins the match. However, a time limit of 30 minute is in place per set. Thus a server should win a point within nine rallies; failing to do so will then result in a point for one's opponent.

The game may be played in singles (one player per side) or doubles (a pair per side).

Faults include a koit hitting the net posts, leaving the court entirely (even if it eventually lands in the court) or striking or passing through  the net, as well as wobbling or shaking of the koit.

Court and equipment

Tennikoit can be played indoors or outside, on any surface which includes red sand, clay, and cement. Courts measure 12.2 by 5.5 metres, regardless of playing singles or doubles, and are divided by a centre line. Each playing zone is 5.2 by 2.75 meters. The height of the net that divides the court another direction is 1.8 meters.

References

External links
 Indian Tennikoit 
 Tennikoit GB (Great Britain) 

Forms of tennis
Sport in Germany by sport
Sport in South Africa by sport
Sports originating in South Asia
Traditional sports of India